The 1931–32 Magyar Kupa (English: Hungarian Cup) was the 14th season of Hungary's annual knock-out cup football competition.

Final

Replay

See also
 1931–32 Nemzeti Bajnokság I

References

External links
 Official site 
 soccerway.com

1931–32 in Hungarian football
1931–32 domestic association football cups
1931-32